The year 1628 in music involved some significant events.

Events 
July 10 – Heinrich Schütz seeks a travel warrant from Johann Georg, Elector of Saxony, to return to Venice to visit Monteverdi and Alessandro Grandi.
November 22 – Girolamo Frescobaldi is given permission by St Peter's Basilica to leave Rome.

Published popular music 
 Carlo Farina

 Melchior Franck
 for four, five, six, seven, and eight voices with basso continuo (Coburg: Johann Forckel for Friedrich Gruner)
 for four, five, and six voices (Coburg: Johann Forckel), a collection of motets
 for three choirs (Coburg: Kaspar Bertsch), two wedding motets
 for four and seven voices (Coburg: Johann Forckel), two motets
Vinko Jelić
 for one, two, three, and four voices with organ bass, Op. 2 (Strasbourg: Paul Lederz)
 for four voices with organ bass, Op. 3 (Strasbourg: Paul Lederz)
Giovanni Girolamo Kapsberger – , vol. 1 (Rome: Paolo Masotti)
Peter Philips –  for one, two, and three voices with organ bass (Antwerp: Pierre Phalèse)

Opera 
Francesca Caccini – 
Marco da Gagliano – , performed at the Teatro Mediceo on October 14 to celebrate the wedding of Odoardo Farnese and Margherita de Medici
Nicholas Lanier – A musical setting (recitativo) of Christopher Marlowe's Hero and Leander 
Claudio Monteverdi –

Births 
January 1 – Christoph Bernhard, German composer (died 1692)
date unknown – Robert Cambert, French composer of opera (died 1677)

Deaths 
January 21 – Gregor Aichinger, composer (born c.1565)
March – Alfonso Ferrabosco the younger, viol player and composer (born c.1575)
March 12 or 13 – John Bull (composer), composer and organist (born c1562)
November 16 – Paolo Quagliati, composer (born c. 1555)
date unknown – Aziz Mahmud Hudayi, Sufi saint, poet, author and composer (born 1541)

References

 
Music
17th century in music
Music by year